Cussler is a surname. Notable people with the surname include:

Clive Cussler (1931–2020), American novelist and explorer
Dirk Cussler (born 1961), American novelist, son of Clive
Edward Cussler (born 1940), American professor of chemical engineering